Tahalka  is a 1992 Indian Hindi-language action adventure film directed by Anil Sharma, featuring an ensemble cast including Dharmendra, Naseeruddin Shah, Aditya Pancholi, Javed Jaffrey, Shammi Kapoor, Amrish Puri, Mukesh Khanna, Ekta Sohini, Pallavi Joshi, Sonu Walia, Shikha Swaroop, and Firdaus Dadi (in her acting debut). The film was the fifth highest grosser of 1992 and was declared a Hit by Box Office India. This film was loosely based on Hollywood action adventure films The Guns of Navarone and Where Eagles Dare.

Plot 
General Dong is the evil dictator of a country called Dongrila. He has kidnapped dozens of school girls and plans to use them as suicide bombers to bomb populated areas in India. He even puts some girls into the personal harem, pushing the remaining ones into prostitution and trafficks their limbs and organs for money. He is also responsible for murdering the chief of the Indian Army, General Sinha. One day, while out for a seaside trip with his daughter, Major Krishna Rao, an officer in the Indian Army, happens to notice an island with his daughter and they find a schoolgirl escaping someone. they try to take her on the boat, but she dies. Then leaving Dolly with his trusted servant, Major Rao himself creeps forward and sees Dong ordering his men to do away with those kids. He calls Dong a clown and other names, and overpowers him, though getting a bullet in his arm in the process. Making all the girls board the two boats, he takes Dong, tied up on board, but then Dong's men come and having kidnapped Dolly, they free Dong from the chamber. Dong warns major Rao to come to Dongrila and rescue his daughter within the next year i.e., 12 months from that very day. He chants an eerie verse and cuts off one of Krishna Rao's legs, thus making him handicapped.

Krishna Rao recruits the best Indian army officers Captain Ranvir, Captain Rakesh, Captain Javed, Captain Anju and former disgraced Major Dharam Singh. Then he somehow makes Shammi Kapoor, the second senior general and Mr. Iyer, the committee chairman agree to his plan. They agree on the condition that Krishna' team's victory would be a national victory, but their defeat will be a personal issue. Then Krishna Rao's team starts their journey and they go on a perilous journey between the borders of China and India to rescue Dolly as well as dozens of school girls held in Dong's captivity and destroy Dong's kingdom of Dongrila.

While the force five leaves, Major Kapoor is seen betraying their locations to Capt. Synthia, who works for General Dong. Allah Rakha catches Kapoor red-handed and reprimands him severely. He expresses his regret that an Indian himself is selling the nation to the enemies. While Allah Rakha tries to finish Kapoor, the latter deceitfully shoots him with a pistol through his blazer pocket and kills him, thus wiping out the first crucial witness.

In their journey, they are helped by Jenny, wife of Dongrila's ex-army chief Mr D'Costa, Prince Couv and Julie. It so happens that in the big city hospital, Major Rao contracts gangrene in his left leg and needs to be operated on. But Dong's men surround the hospital and shooting begins. They even cut off the electrical supply so the team decides to obtain a generator from the base room. Rakesh says that they shall have to capture the whole area after killing all these soldiers. Just then Krishna comes there and says that they've already endangered the mission. He asks them to escape by going down a valley that Anju discovered on the other side of the hospital. Dharam Singh says that he will complete the mission here itself and asks major Rao to behave like a commander. But Major Rao chooses him as the next commander and makes him promise to lead the team for making the mission a success. All of them start climbing down the valley as Major Rao gathers all the guns and starts fighting alone. As the team reaches the foot of the valley, Dong's men blast the hospital acting by his orders and by sheer misfortune, Major Rao loses his life in fighting the Dong's Army. Another blow strikes when Julie's brother captain Jello kills the little son of Mrs. D'costa as he catches the child spying on them. It is revealed that the little boy was helping Prince Couv. It is found out that Julie is an informer of Dong's Captain Cynthia. Her identity is disclosed and she is killed by Captain Ranvir. Then, in retaliation, Dong gives execution orders for Cynthia. But, Cynthia is saved by Javed and Rakesh, who is then offered to switch sides. Then, they all attack Dong and kill him. But, lastly, in flight Brigadier Kapoor attacks the team and reveals himself as an informer of Dong. But, he is cleverly killed by Major Dharam Singh, saying the famous dialogue of the movie The Good, the Bad and the Ugly, "If you want to shoot, shoot, don't talk."

Cast 

 Shammi Kapoor as Brigadier Kapoor
 Dharmendra as Major Dharam Singh
 Naseeruddin Shah as Captain Ranveer
 Aditya Pancholi as Captain Rakesh
 Javed Jaffrey as Captain Javed
 Ekta Sohini as Captain Anju Sinha
 Shikha Swaroop as Intelligence Chief Cynthia
 Pallavi Joshi as Julie
 Mukesh Khanna as Major Krishna Rao
 Prem Chopra as Prince Kow
 Gulshan Grover as Allah Rakha
 Amrish Puri as General Dong
 Sudhir as Dong's Right Hand
 Tom Alter	as Dong's Army Captain
 Bob Christo as Dong's Henchman		
 Dan Dhanoa as Jelu 
 Jack Gaud	as Dong's Army Captain Richard
 Anirudh Agarwal as Dong's Henchman		
 Guddi Maruti as Salma
 Rajendra Nath as Lifeguard at swimming pool
 Dilip Dhawan as Captain Wilson D'Costa
 Sonu Walia as Jenny D'Costa  
 Parikshat Sahni as General Sinha
 Firdaus Dadi as Dolly Rolly Grow up Twins Sister
 Ram Sethi	as Laural
 Sudha Chandran as Seema in a special appearance
 R. S. Mallik (Gorilla) as Dong's Henchman

Soundtrack 

The music is composed by Anu Malik.

References

External links 
 

1992 films
1990s Hindi-language films
Cross-dressing in Indian films
Films scored by Anu Malik
Films shot in Tamil Nadu
1990s action adventure films
Indian action adventure films
Films about dictators
Films set in a fictional country
Films directed by Anil Sharma